Yunusov Gayyur — Azerbaijani painter, member of the Union of Artists of Azerbaijan, People's Artist of the Republic of Azerbaijan.

Early life 
Gayyur Yunus was born on March 26, 1948, in the village of Amirjan in Baku. After graduating from middle school, During the years 1967-1971 he studied at the Baku Art school named Azim Azimzade and at the Faculty of Painting at the Tbilisi Art Academy in 1971–1977. He's been attending exhibitions since 1972. In 1980, he was admitted to Azerbaijani Artists ' Association and Union of Artists of the USSR. When he was young, he came near his hometown relative Sattar Bahlulzada and he watched how he drew the pictures. He has been disciple of Sattar Bahlulzada and he learned the various branches of art.

Gayyur Yunus has said the following about his birthplace: I was born in this village, i got my first education here, and then I lived in this village for a lifetime. Wherever I went, the came back here after all. Amirjan is the most dear and dearest place for me. This is all reflected in my creative work.

Creativity 
While his creativity was lyrical and landscapes, he gave him a reputation for female portraits. His religious-philosophical gaze, love of beauty, appears in his works. The main culmination of his creations is female pictures. One of the main reasons that the author's image of Azerbaijani woman is shown in elegance and dignity is "God is beautiful and loves beauty". The beauty of the women he creates is evident from their faces and national dresses. The author emphasizes that the female characters he draws are Azerbaijanis and Muslim women. The background of portraits drawn with oil on canvas are pear, fish, bird, Flower, epigraphic writings, etc. Some symbols are used, such as the artist's own personal fantasies and individual symbolic meanings given to each. There are also examples of calligrapher characters written in some Arabic letters. These writings are especially  "Allah ", they are religious expressions such as  "Bismillahir-rahmanir-Rahim ",  "Alif",  "Lam",  "Mim",  "Haqq",  "La ilaha Allah". Gayyur Yunus, in addition to Azerbaijani and Cyrillic alphabet, also signs the Arabic alphabet. In this respect, all of Gayyur Yunus's works are emphasized and proudly delivered to the audience.

11 individual exhibitions of Gayyur Yunus in Azerbaijan and various foreign countries have been held since 1972. His works are held in public and private collections in various countries such as Germany, Turkey, USA, France, Norway, Finland, Denmark, Holland, Syria, England, Poland, Algeria, Iran and Russia. Since 1988, individual exhibitions have been opened in Baku, London, Alma-Ata.
Currently, the pictures of Yunus are in the Azerbaijan State Art Museum, the Tbilisi Folk Friendship Museum, the Pavlador Art Museum, the Moscow State Tretyakov Gallery, the Moscow East Art Museum, the Lorangeri Gallery in France, and the personal collection of Rokfeller's New York City Protected.
The artist's last individual exhibition was held at the Museum of Oriental Arts in Moscow, Russia. The exhibition took place under the slogan "Hidden and visible".

Awards 
Humay Award – 1995
"Artist of the Republic of Azerbaijan" Honorary title - May 30, 2002 
"Tərəqqi" Medal -18 October 2011 
"People's Artist of the Republic of Azerbaijan" Honorary title - December 30, 2015

References 

Azerbaijani artists
20th-century Azerbaijani painters
21st-century Azerbaijani painters
1948 births
Living people